The 1970 Icelandic Cup was the 11th edition of the National Football Cup.

It took place between 2 July 1969 and 14 November 1969, with the final played at Melavöllur in Reykjavik. The cup was important, as winners qualified for the UEFA Cup Winners' Cup (if a club won both the league and the cup, the defeated finalists would take their place in the Cup Winners' Cup).

The top three finishers from the previous season (ÍA Akranes, ÍBK Keflavík and KR Reykjavik did not enter until the quarter finals, the other teams from the 1. Deild (first division) entered in the fourth round. In prior rounds, teams from the 2. Deild (2nd division), as well as reserve teams, played in one-legged matches. In case of a draw, the match was replayed. For the first time, reserve teams did not enter from this season.

Fram Reykjavik won their first Icelandic Cup, beating ÍBV Vestmannaeyjar in the final, and so qualifying for Europe.

First round

Second round

Third round

Fourth round

Fifth round 

 Entry of Valur Reykjavik, Vikingur Reykjavik, ÍBA Akureyri, ÍBV Vestmannaeyjar and Fram Reykjavik.

Quarter finals 

 Entry of ÍA Akranes, ÍBK Keflavík and KR Reykjavík.

Semi finals

Final 

 Fram Reykjavik won their first Icelandic Cup and qualified for the 1971–72 European Cup Winners' Cup.

See also 

 1970 Úrvalsdeild
 Icelandic Cup

External links 
  1970 Icelandic Cup results at the site of the Icelandic Football Federation

Icelandic Men's Football Cup
Iceland
1970 in Iceland